Moroccan cuisine is the cuisine of Morocco,  fueled by interactions and exchanges with many cultures and nations over the centuries. Moroccan cuisine is usually a mix of Berber, Andalusi, Mediterranean, and Arab cuisines, with minimal European (French and Spanish) and sub-Saharan influences. Like the rest of the Maghrebi cuisine, Moroccan cuisine has more in common with Middle Eastern cuisine than with the rest of Africa.

According to Moroccan chef and cuisine researcher Hossin Houari, the oldest traces of Moroccan cuisine that can still be observed today, go back to the 7th century BC.

Ingredients
Morocco produces a large range of Mediterranean fruits and vegetables, as well as tropical products like snails. Common meats include beef, goat, mutton and lamb, which, together with chicken and seafood, serve as a base for the cuisine. Characteristic flavorings include lemon pickle, argan oil, preserved butter (smen), olive oil, and dried fruits.

The staple grains today are rice and wheat, used for bread and couscous, though until the mid-20th century, barley was an important staple, especially in the south. Grapes are mostly eaten fresh, as a dessert; wine consumption is only about 1 liter per capita per year. The traditional cooking fats are butter and animal fat, though olive oil is now replacing them. Butter is used both fresh, zebeda, and preserved, smen.

Flavorings
Spices and Ras el hanout are used extensively in Moroccan food. Although some spices have been imported to Morocco through the Arabs, introducing Persian and Arabic cooking influences, many ingredients—like saffron from Talaouine, mint and olives from Meknes, and oranges and lemons from Fes—are home-grown, and are being exported. After the Idrissids established Fes in 789, predominant in Arab culture, many spices were brought from the east. Common spices include cinnamon, cumin, turmeric, ginger, paprika, coriander, saffron, mace, cloves, fennel, anise, nutmeg, cayenne pepper, fenugreek, caraway, black pepper and sesame seeds. Twenty-seven spices are combined for the Moroccan spice mixture ras el hanout.

Common herbs in Moroccan cuisine include mint, parsley, coriander, oregano, peppermint, marjoram, verbena, sage and bay laurel.

Structure of meals

A typical lunch begins with a series of hot and cold salads, followed by a tagine or dwaz. Often, for a formal meal, a lamb or chicken dish is next, or couscous topped with meat and vegetables. Traditionally, Moroccans eat with their hands and use bread. The consumption of pork and alcohol is uncommon due to religious restrictions.

Main dishes 

The main Moroccan dish people are most familiar with is couscous; lamb is the most commonly eaten meat in Morocco, usually eaten in a tagine with a wide selection of vegetables. Chicken is also very commonly used in tagines or roasted. They also use additional ingredients such as plums, boiled eggs, and lemon. Like their national food, the tagine has a unique taste of popular spices such as saffron, cumin, cinnamon, ginger, and cilantro, as well as ground red pepper.

Moroccan cuisine has ample seafood dishes. European pilchard is caught in large but declining quantities. Other fish species include mackerel, anchovy, sardinella, and horse mackerel.

Other famous Moroccan dishes are pastilla (also spelled basteeya or bestilla), tanjia, and rfissa.

A big part of the daily meal is bread. Bread in Morocco is principally made from durum wheat semolina known as khobz. Bakeries are very common throughout Morocco and fresh bread is a staple in every city, town, and village. The most common is whole-grain coarse ground or white-flour bread or baguettes. There are also a number of flat breads and pulled unleavened pan-fried breads.

In addition, there are dried salted meats and salted preserved meats such as khlea and g'did (basically sheep bacon), which are used to flavor tagines or used in el rghaif, a folded savory Moroccan pancake.

Soups 
Harira, a typical heavy soup, eaten during winter to warm up and is usually served for dinner. It is typically eaten with plain bread or with dates during the month of Ramadan. Bissara is a broad bean-based soup that is also consumed during the colder months of the year.

Salads 
Salads include both raw and cooked vegetables, served either hot or cold. include zaalouk, an aubergine and tomato mixture, and taktouka (a mixture of tomatoes, smoked green peppers, garlic, and spices) characteristic of the cities of Taza and Fes, in the Atlas. Another cold salad is called bakoula, or khoubiza, consisting of braised mallow leaves, but can also be made with spinach or arugula, with parsley, cilantro, lemon, olive oil, and olives.

Desserts 

Usually, seasonal fruits rather than cooked desserts are served at the close of a meal. A common dessert is kaab el ghzal (gazelle ankles), a pastry stuffed with almond paste and topped with sugar. Another is halwa chebakia, pretzel-shaped dough deep-fried, soaked in honey and sprinkled with sesame seeds; it is eaten during the month of Ramadan. Jowhara is a delicacy typical of Fes, made with fried waraq pastry, cream, and toasted almond slices. Coconut fudge cakes, 'Zucre Coco', are popular also.

Seafood 

Morocco is endowed with over 3000 km of coastline. There is an abundance of fish in these coastal waters with the sardine being commercially significant as Morocco is the world's largest exporter. Sardines were used in the production of garum in Lixus.

At Moroccan fish markets one can find sole, swordfish, tuna, turbot, mackerel, shrimp, conger eel, skate, red snapper, spider crab, lobster and a variety of mollusks.

In Moroccan cuisine, seafood is incorporated into, among others, tajines, bastilla, briouat, and paella.

Drinks 

The most popular drink is Moroccan mint tea, locally called atay. Traditionally, making good mint tea in Morocco is considered an art form and the drinking of it with friends and family is often a daily tradition. The pouring technique is as crucial as the quality of the tea itself. Moroccan tea pots have long, curved pouring spouts and this allows the tea to be poured evenly into tiny glasses from a height. For the best taste, glasses are filled in two stages. The Moroccans traditionally like tea with bubbles, so while pouring they hold the teapot high above the glasses. Finally, the tea is accompanied with hard sugar cones or lumps. Morocco has an abundance of oranges and tangerines, so fresh orange juice is easily found and inexpensive.

Snacks and fast food
Selling fast food in the street has long been a tradition, and the best example is Djemaa el Fna square in Marrakech. Ma'quda is a potato fritter popular among students and people of modest means, particularly in Fes. Starting in the 1980s, new snack restaurants, primarily in the north, started serving bocadillos (a Spanish word for a sandwich).

Dairy product shops locally called mhlaba, are very prevalent all around the country. Those dairy stores generally offer all types of dairy products, juices, smoothies, and local fare such as bocadillos, msemmen and harcha.

The khanz u-bnīn ( "stinky and delicious") is a cheap and popular street sandwich.

Another popular street food in Morocco is snails, served in their juices in small bowls, and eaten using a toothpick.

In the late 1990s, several multinational fast-food franchises opened restaurants in major cities.

Chefs 
Among those who have brought Moroccan cuisine to a wider audience are TV chef Choumicha and Al-Amīn al-Hajj Mustafa an-Nakīr, chef to the former king of Morocco Hassan II.

See also 

 Arab cuisine
 Beer in Morocco
 Culture of Morocco
 History of Morocco
 List of Moroccan dishes
 Tourism in Morocco
 Languages in Morocco
 Jewish cuisine
 List of African cuisines
 Mediterranean cuisine
 Maghrebi cuisine

References 

 26. The Moroccan Food

Further reading

Recipe books 
 Connaître la cuisine marocaine, by Liliane Otal, Editions SudOuest, 1999 (in French). 
 Cooking at the Kasbah: Recipes from My Moroccan Kitchen, by Kitty Morse, Laurie Smith  
 Couscous and Other Good Food from Morocco, by Paula Wolfert, Gael Greene 
 Cuisine des palais d'orient, by Alain Mordelet 
 Food of Morocco: Authentic Recipes from the North African Coast, by Fatema Hal 
 Scent of Orange Blossoms: Sephardic Cuisine from Morocco, by Kitty Morse, Owen Morse 
 Traditional Moroccan Cooking: Recipes from Fez, by Madame Guinaudeau 

 
Arab cuisine
North African cuisine
Mediterranean cuisine
Maghrebi cuisine